The glistening-green tanager (Chlorochrysa phoenicotis) is a species of bird in the family Thraupidae. It is found in Colombia and Ecuador.

Its natural habitat is subtropical or tropical moist montane forests.

Males are almost entirely bright glistening emerald green, with small gray patches behind and below the eye with another on the shoulders.  Females are slightly duller than males.

References

glistening-green tanager
Birds of the Colombian Andes
Birds of the Ecuadorian Andes
glistening-green tanager
glistening-green tanager
Taxonomy articles created by Polbot